Ali Love (born Alexander Williams, 1979) is an English musician, singer, songwriter and record producer. Previously signed to Columbia Records as a solo artist, he is now a member of the house music band Hot Natured and the duo Infinity Ink.

About
In 2006, Ali Love released his first two singles, "K-Hole" and "Camera on a Pole" on his own independent label "I Love Records". He rose to the limelight providing vocals for The Chemical Brothers hit, "Do It Again", for their 2007 album, We Are the Night. "Do It Again" was synced to the worldwide commercial for Paco Rabanne's "1 Million"  and "Lady Million".

In 2007, Ali released his first major single, "Secret Sunday Lover". This was followed by "Late Night Session" on Columbia Records.

Discography

Singles
2006: "K-Hole"
2006: "Camera on a Pole"
2007: "Do It Again" (with The Chemical Brothers) No. 12 UK, No. 2 Italy, No. 13 Japan, No. 16 Ireland
2007: "Secret Sunday Lover" (#45 UK, No. 22 UK Physical Singles Chart)
2007: "Late Night Session"
2009: "Diminishing Returns"
2010: "Love Harder"
2010: "Smoke & Mirrors"
2010: "Moscow Girl"
2011: "Different Morals" (with Luca C & Brigante)
2011: "Forward Motion" (Hot Natured (Jamie Jones and Lee Foss) song)
2011: "Civilization" (with Justice)
2012: "Infinity" (Infinity Ink )
2012: "Benediction" (Hot Natured (Jamie Jones and Lee Foss) song) 
2012: "Playa/ Jungle"
2013: "Emperor"
2013: "Another"
2013: "Isis (Magic Carpet Ride)" (Hot Natured Feat.The Egyptian Lover)
2013: "Reverse Skydiving " (Hot Natured Feat.Anabel Englund)
2014: "What Can I Do?" (with Secondcity) No. 85 UK
2014: "Perfect Picture"
2014: "Deep into the Night"
2015: "EML Ritual" (with The Chemical Brothers)
2016: "The Rush" (Infinity Ink feat. Mr. V)
2016: "How Do I Love You" (Infinity Ink feat. Yasmin)
2016: "Full Capacity" (Infinity Ink )
2016: "Too Strong "
2016: "Till The Light" (Infinity Ink with Lee Foss)
2017: "Alienation " (Infinity Ink )
2017: "Blue is the distance"  (with Lee Foss)
2017: "Throwing Stones"  (with Freeform Five)
2018: "Dopamine Machine" (with CamelPhat)
2018: "Jacuzzi Rollercoaster" (with Róisín Murphy) 
2018: "Rushing Back" (Infinity Ink feat. Yasmin)
2019: "Caught in the Middle" (Creative Principle (Dan Ward))
2020: "Stronger" (with Kaz James)
2020: "Everything" (with Acid monday,The show, Wolfgang Haffner)
2020: "My Life Muzik" (with Felix da Housecat)
2020: "Spektrum" (with CamelPhat)
2021: "Ubiquity" (with Nicky Night Time feat.Breakbot)
2021: "Confusion" (with &ME, Rampa, Adam Port, Keinemusik)

Albums
2007: Love Music
2010: Love Harder
2013: Different Sides Of The Sun ( Hot Natured)
2014: P.U.M.P.
2019: House of Infinity ( Infinity Ink)

Remixes

Music videos

Soundtracks and syncs
Skins E4 Trailer – "Diminishing Returns"
Paco Rabanne "1 Million" Advertisement – "Do it Again" (The Chemical Brothers)
Paco Rabanne "Lady Million" Advertisement – "Do it Again" (The Chemical Brothers)
Adidas 2011 "Adidas Is All In" Commercial – "Civilization" (Justice)

Television appearances
Freshly Squeezed – Channel 4 (2007)
MTV2 – Spanking New Sessions (2007)
BBC2 – Warehouse Projects (2007)

References

External links 
 Ali Love Beatport
 Ali Love Traxsource
 Ali Love Discogs 
Interview and live review in LeftLion Magazine
Interview with Ali Love (including Audio)

British dance musicians
1979 births
Living people
English male singers
21st-century English singers
21st-century British male singers